Medon is a city in Madison County, Tennessee. It is included in the Jackson, Tennessee Metropolitan Statistical Area. The population was 178 at the 2010 census.

Geography 

History 

By 1886, about three hundred people were living in the area of Medon, which was formed along the Illinois Central Railroad ten miles south of Jackson; a high school had been incorporated there in 1881 and the area was surrounded by a rich agricultural community. The school was incorporated into South Side High School in 1956.

Demographics 

As of the census of 2000, there were 191 people, 78 households, and 60 families residing in the city. The population density was 196.3 people per square mile (76.0/km2). There were 83 housing units at an average density of 85.3 per square mile (33.0/km2). The racial makeup of the city was 91.62% White, 5.76% African American, 0.52% Native American, 0.52% Asian, and 1.57% from two or more races.

There were 78 households, out of which 33.3% had children under the age of 18 living with them, 56.4% were married couples living together, 16.7% had a female householder with no husband present, and 21.8% were non-families. 20.5% of all households were made up of individuals, and 9.0% had someone living alone who was 65 years of age or older. The average household size was 2.45 and the average family size was 2.80.

In the city, the population was spread out, with 24.1% under the age of 18, 6.3% from 18 to 24, 23.0% from 25 to 44, 30.9% from 45 to 64, and 15.7% who were 65 years of age or older. The median age was 42 years. For every 100 females, there were 85.4 males. For every 100 females age 18 and over, there were 79.0 males.

The median income for a household in the city was $26,750, and the median income for a family was $27,813. Males had a median income of $30,208 versus $21,875 for females. The per capita income for the city was $13,313. About 15.2% of families and 17.9% of the population were below the poverty line, including 39.5% of those under the age of eighteen and none of those 65 or over.

Economy 
Medon was traditionally a farming community. It is now part of the Jackson, Tennessee metropolitan area, and many of its residents commute to Jackson or to jobs in other suburbs.

References

Cities in Tennessee
Cities in Madison County, Tennessee
Jackson metropolitan area, Tennessee